Olov "Olle" Axel Herman Ohlson (18 June 1921 – 12 May 1983) was a Swedish water polo player who competed in the 1948 Summer Olympics. In 1948 he was part of the Swedish team which finished fifth in the water polo tournament. He played five matches.

References

1921 births
1983 deaths
Swedish male water polo players
Olympic water polo players of Sweden
Water polo players at the 1948 Summer Olympics